The 2018 Haifa mayoral election was held on 30 October 2018 to elect the mayor of Haifa. It saw the election of Einat Kalisch-Rotem, who unseated incumbent mayor Yona Yahav. Kalisch-Rotem became the first female mayor of Haifa, making Haifa the largest city in Israel, and first major Israeli city, to ever have a female mayor.

The election was part of the 2018 Israeli municipal elections.

Candidates
Avihu Han (Haifa Greens)
Einat Kalisch-Rotem (Living in Haifa), city council member, urban planner, teacher and 2013 mayoral candidate
Mendi Salzmann	(Haifa Awakens)
Israel Ya'akov Savyon (Lovers of Haifa)
Yona Yahav (Yona Yahav and Haifa's Youth), incumbent mayor since 2003

Campaign
Kalisch-Rotem's candidacy was endorsed by the Meretz party. While Kalisch-Rotem's candidacy was endorsed by the national Israeli Labor Party leader Avi Gabbay, she did not receive the backing of the local Labor Party. The local Labor Party was headed by mayoral opponent Israel Savyon. Nevertheless, her ultimate victory was seen as a boon for the troubled Labor Party, with a Gabbay-backed candidate defeating Yahav, who was seen as close to Moshe Kahlon, a political enemy of Gabbay.

Despite her being nonreligious, Kalisch-Rotem's candidacy also received support from the city's Haredi community, including from the Degel HaTorah party. Haredi support for a female mayoral candidate was considered notable, as Haredi are seen as tending to believe that leadership should be exclusive to men, as well as tending to believe that women should avoid bringing attention to themselves in the manner required of politicians. Haredi residents of the city backed Kalisch-Rotem with the intent of ousting Yahav.

Kalisch-Rotem's candidacy had originally been disqualified by a district court due to the fact that her lawyer and the Labor Party had submitted both her candidacy and the candidacy of Israel Savyon. However, on 22 October, 2018, the Supreme Court of Israel, decided that she would be allowed to run.

Of the hundreds of Israeli communities that held mayoral races held during the 2018 municipal elections, Haifa was one of roughly ten cities to elect a woman as its mayor. This was an increase from the seven communities that had elected female mayors during the 2013 municipal elections.

Results
The results in Haifa, with 125,333 voters participating of 256,559 eligible , are as follows. Of the 125,333 votes, 118,271 were valid.

Kalisch-Rotem's victory was considered an upset.

References

Haifa
Mayoral elections in Haifa